Omar Blondahl, (6 February 1923 – 11 December 1993), also known as "Sagebrush Sam", was a musician who became fascinated with the largely unrecorded folk songs of Newfoundland, Canada, and became famous for popularizing them.

Blondahl was born in Wynyard, Saskatchewan of Icelandic parents.

Blondahl was en route to visit his father's grave in Iceland, when he stopped in Newfoundland to raise more money to continue the trip.  He looked for work at a local radio station, where the manager, upon learning that he was a folk singer, showed him a copy of the newly published third edition of the Gerald S. Doyle songbook. Blondahl recalls:

He tossed a Gerald S. Doyle songbook on the table and he said, "Can you sing any of that?" And this was my first introduction to Newfoundland folk music, so I opened it and thumbed through, I said "My God this is beautiful stuff." I had never heard any of it before and I said "This must be on all kinds of records," I said "I've never run across any of it." He said, "I don't think any of them are on records" and I thought this is a gold mine, you know, oh my.
-- Omar Blondahl, interviewed by Neil V. Rosenberg, Vancouver, 28 May 1988. MUNFLA 88-084, C11109.

He died in Vancouver, British Columbia in December 1993 at the age of 70.

See also
 List of Newfoundland songs

External links
 Newfoundland Heritage, Traditional Songs
 Omar Blondahl's Contribution to the Newfoundland Folksong Canon in Canadian Journal for Traditional Music (1991)
 The Man Who Sang Goodbye

1923 births
1993 deaths
Musicians from Saskatchewan
Canadian people of Icelandic descent
Canadian folk singers
Musicians from Newfoundland and Labrador
People from Wynyard, Saskatchewan
20th-century Canadian male singers